Robert Pine (born Granville Whitelaw Pine, July 10, 1941) is an American actor who is best known as Sgt. Joseph Getraer on the television series CHiPs (1977–1983). Including CHiPs, Pine has appeared in over 400 episodes of television.

Life and career
Pine was born in New York City on July 10, 1941, the son of Virginia (née Whitelaw) and Granville Martin Pine, a patent attorney. He graduated from Ohio Wesleyan University in 1963. He is married to Gwynne Gilford, who appeared in several episodes of CHiPs as Betty Getraer, the wife of Pine's character. They have two children, actors Chris and Katie.

Pine arrived in Hollywood in 1964, where he learned to ride horses because as a contract player with Universal Studios, he was frequently featured in westerns. Pine remained under contract with Universal until 1967. During his career he starred on the soap opera Days of Our Lives as Walter Coleman and had guest appearances in many American television shows, including Gunsmoke, Lost in Space, The Silent Force, The Wild Wild West, Barnaby Jones, Lou Grant, and Knight Rider. On Magnum, P.I., he appeared as Thomas Magnum's father in a flashback episode. From 1977 to 1983, he starred on NBC's CHiPs for six seasons as Sgt. Joseph Getraer, the gruff immediate supervisor to the show's two protagonists.

In the late 1980s, Pine guest-starred as Peter Morris, Zack's father, in an episode of Good Morning, Miss Bliss. That show went on to become Saved by the Bell. In the early 1990s, Pine portrayed two villains. For California Dreams, he played a wealthy racist who sabotages his daughter's friendship with drummer Tony (William James Jones). For the CBS Schoolbreak Special Big Boys Don't Cry, he played a pedophile who molests his two nephews. In 1994, he guest-starred as Bart Tupelo on CBS' Harts of the West comedy/western starring Beau Bridges and Lloyd Bridges. He reprised his role as Joe Getraer in the 1998 TNT TV movie CHiPs '99.

For Star Trek: Voyager, he guest starred as the Akritirian Ambassador Liria in the Season 3 episode "The Chute". For Star Trek: Enterprise, he guest-starred as Vulcan Captain Tavin in the Season 1 episode "Fusion". Among his other credits are Six Feet Under, Beverly Hills 90210, and Match Game. In September 2013, he appeared as Grandpa Jack in Kaiser Permanente's television ad "Thrive - Perfectly Ordinary". He was the voice of the Bishop of Arendelle in Disney's 2013 animated movie Frozen.

Filmography

Film

Television

Video games
 SOCOM: Confrontation as VIP 3
 Star Wars: The Old Republic as Master Orgus Din
 Bionic Commando as Patrick Armstrong
 Anarchy Reigns as Maximillian Caxton

References

External links

Official website

1941 births
Living people
American male film actors
American male television actors
American male voice actors
CHiPs
People from Scarsdale, New York
Male actors from New York City
20th-century American male actors
21st-century American male actors
Universal Pictures contract players
Ohio Wesleyan University alumni
Pine family